Da Vinci is a restaurant in Maasbracht in the Netherlands. It is a fine dining restaurant that is awarded one Michelin star for the period 1999-2008 and again from 2018 to present. From 2008 till 2018 it was awarded with two stars. GaultMillau awarded the restaurant 17.0 points (out of 20).

The restaurant is a member of Alliance Gastronomique Néerlandaise, a Dutch/Belgian culinary association of quality restaurants and the Confrérie de la Chaîne des Rôtisseurs.

See also
List of Michelin starred restaurants in the Netherlands

References 

Restaurants in the Netherlands
Michelin Guide starred restaurants in the Netherlands
Restaurants in Limburg (Netherlands)
Maasgouw